Judge Settle may refer to:

Thomas Settle (judge) (1831–1888), judge of the United States District Court for the Northern District of Florida after serving as an associate justice of the Supreme Court of North Carolina
Benjamin Settle (born 1947), judge of the United States District Court for the Western District of Washington